Farnesol is a natural 15-carbon  organic compound which is an acyclic sesquiterpene alcohol. Under standard conditions, it is a colorless liquid. It is hydrophobic, and thus insoluble in water, but miscible with oils.

Farnesol is produced from 5-carbon isoprene compounds in both plants and animals. Phosphate-activated derivatives of farnesol are the building blocks of possibly all acyclic sesquiterpenoids. These compounds are doubled to form 30-carbon squalene, which is the precursor for steroids in plants, animals, and fungi. Farnesol and its derivatives are important starting compounds for natural and artificial organic synthesis.

Uses
Farnesol is present in many essential oils such as citronella, neroli, cyclamen, lemon grass, tuberose, rose, musk, balsam, and tolu.  It is used in perfumery to emphasize the odors of sweet, floral perfumes. It enhances perfume scent by acting as a co-solvent that regulates the volatility of the odorants. It is especially used in lilac perfumes.

Farnesol is a natural pesticide for mites and is a pheromone for several other insects.

In a 1994 report released by five top cigarette companies, farnesol was listed as one of 599 additives to cigarettes. It is a flavoring ingredient.

Natural source and synthesis

Farnesol is produced from isoprene compounds in both plants and animals. When geranyl pyrophosphate reacts with isopentenyl pyrophosphate, the result is the 15-carbon farnesyl pyrophosphate, which is an intermediate in the biosynthesis of sesquiterpenes such as farnesene. Oxidation can then provide sesquiterpenoids such as farnesol.
In industry, farnesol could be synthesized from linalool

History of the name
Farnesol is found in a flower extract with a long history of use in perfumery. The pure substance farnesol was named (c. 1900–1905) after the Farnese acacia tree (Vachellia farnesiana), since the flowers from the tree were the commercial source of the floral essence in which the chemical was identified. This particular acacia species, in turn, is named after Cardinal Odoardo Farnese (1573–1626) of the notable Italian Farnese family which (from 1550 though the 17th century) maintained some of the first private European botanical gardens in the Farnese Gardens in Rome. The addition of the -ol ending results from it being chemically an alcohol. The plant itself was brought to the Farnese gardens from the Caribbean and Central America, where it originates.

Cosmetics
Farnesol is used as a deodorant in cosmetic products. Farnesol is subject to restrictions on its use in perfumery, because some people may become sensitised to it.

Biological function
Farnesol is used by the fungus Candida albicans as a quorum sensing molecule that inhibits filamentation.

Research 
Farnesol is studied as a potential treatment for Parkinson's disease. Farnesol blocks the detrimental effects of PARIS (a protein that accumulates in the brains of people with Parkinson's) build-up in cells grown in the lab and in mice models.

See also
 Farnesylation
 Farnesene
 Farnesyl pyrophosphate
 Geranylgeraniol
 Nerolidol

References

Fatty alcohols
Alkene derivatives
Sesquiterpenes
Perfume ingredients
Flavors
Insect pheromones
Primary alcohols